Michael Stulce (born July 14, 1969) is a former shot putter from the United States who was an outstanding athlete at Texas A&M University. While at A&M, he worked with throws coach Robert Parker. He won the gold medal at the 1992 Summer Olympics in Barcelona, Spain. He is also three times national champion. In 1993 he won the U.S. National shot put Championships.

Stulce had returned from a 1990 two-year doping ban just in time to win the gold medal at the Barcelona Olympics.

He subsequently failed another doping test at the 1993 World Outdoor Championships and received a life ban.

References
 
 

1969 births
Living people
American male shot putters
Olympic gold medalists for the United States in track and field
Athletes (track and field) at the 1992 Summer Olympics
Texas A&M Aggies men's track and field athletes
People from Killeen, Texas
Track and field athletes from Texas
Doping cases in athletics
Medalists at the 1992 Summer Olympics
Universiade medalists in athletics (track and field)
Athletes stripped of World Athletics Championships medals
Universiade silver medalists for the United States
World Athletics Indoor Championships winners
Medalists at the 1989 Summer Universiade